Karahan is a Turkish word that may refer to:

States

 Karakhanids, a medieval Turkic dynasty in Central Asia

People

 Enwer Karahan (born 1962), Kurdish writer
 Hakan Karahan (born 1960), Turkish writer and songwriter
 Pelin Karahan (born 1984), Turkish actress

Places

 Karahan, Aladağ, a village in Aladağ district of Adana Province, Turkey
 Karahan, Çukurova, a village in Seyhan district of Adana Province, Turkey
 Karahan, İspir

Turkish-language surnames